Oyama Shrine may refer to:
Oyama Shrine (Ishikawa) (尾山神社), Kanazawa, Ishikawa
 (雄山神社), Tateyama, Toyama